2207 Antenor  is a large Jupiter trojan from the Trojan camp, approximately  in diameter. It was discovered on 19 August 1977, by Russian astronomer Nikolai Chernykh at the Crimean Astrophysical Observatory in Nauchnyj on the Crimean peninsula. The dark D-type asteroid is one of the 30 largest Jupiter trojans and has a rotation period of 7.97 hours. It was named for the Trojan hero and sage Antenor, from Greek mythology. In October 2018, it was reported that Antenor is likely a binary system. If confirmed, it would be 5th known binary Jupiter trojan.

Orbit and classification 

Antenor is a dark Jovian asteroid orbiting in the trailing Trojan camp at Jupiter's  Lagrangian point, 60° behind its orbit in a 1:1 resonance . It is also a non-family asteroid from the Jovian background population.

It orbits the Sun at a distance of 5.1–5.2 AU once every 11 years and 8 months (4,263 days; semi-major axis of 5.15 AU). Its orbit has an eccentricity of 0.02 and an inclination of 7° with respect to the ecliptic. The asteroid was first observed in a precovery taken at Lowell Observatory in March 1959. The body's observation arc begins with its official discovery observation at Nauchnij in August 1977.

Naming 

This minor planet is named after Antenor, one of the wisest of the elders and counselor of King Priam of Troy. Sympathetic to a negotiated peace with the Greeks, he advised his countrymen to return Helen of Troy to Menelaus during the Trojan War.  In later accounts, Antenor was made an open traitor, who unsealed the gates of Troy to the Greek enemy. The official  was published by the Minor Planet Center on 1 March 1981.

Physical characteristics 

Antenor is classified as a dark D-type asteroid in the Tholen and Barucci taxonomy (latter as "D0").

Lightcurves 

The first rotational lightcurves of Antenor were obtained from photometric observations in October 1989, by astronomers Mario Di Martino and Maria Gonano–Beurer with the now decommissioned ESO 1-metre telescope at La Silla in Chile. In April 1969, a follow-up observation by Mottola gave the so-far best-rated rotation period of in 7.965 hours with a brightness variation of 0.09 magnitude.

In September 2012, by astronomers at the Palomar Transient Factory derived two concurring period of   hours with an amplitude of 0.12 and 0.15 in the R- and S-band respectively. Between 2016 and 2018, observation by Robert Stephens at the Center for Solar System Studies, California, gave rotation period of 7.906, 7.964 hours with an amplitude of 0.09.

Unconfirmed satellite 

In October 2018, Stephens, in collaboration with Brian Warner  and several other European observers including Amadeo Aznarand / and Vladimir Benishek at Belgrade Observatory, reported that Antenor is likely a binary system. An orbital period for the suspected minor-planet moon could not be determined. If confirmed, it would be 5th known binary Jupiter trojan.

Diameter and albedo 

According to the surveys carried out by the Infrared Astronomical Satellite IRAS, the Japanese Akari satellite and the NEOWISE mission of NASA's Wide-field Infrared Survey Explorer, Antenor measures between 85.11 and 97.66 kilometers in diameter and its surface has an albedo between 0.051 and 0.0678. The Collaborative Asteroid Lightcurve Link an albedo of 0.0678 and a diameter of 85.11 kilometers based on an absolute magnitude of 8.89.

Notes

References

External links 
 Asteroids with Satellites, Robert Johnston, johnstonsarchive.net
 Robert Stephens, Center for Solar System Studies (CS3)
 Asteroid Lightcurve Database (LCDB), query form (info )
 Dictionary of Minor Planet Names, Google books
 Discovery Circumstances: Numbered Minor Planets (1)-(5000) – Minor Planet Center
 
 

002207
Discoveries by Nikolai Chernykh
Named minor planets
002207
002207
19770819